Samkelo 'Sam' Mvimbi (born 23 January 1999) is a South African field hockey player. He competed in the 2020 Summer Olympics.

Personal life
Mvimbi attended Oakhill High School, and are is graduated from University of Pretoria is BAdmin International Relations.

Honours

Club

Western Province Hockey
2022 Senior IPT Men - A Section - Player of the Tournament

References

External links

1999 births
Living people
Field hockey players at the 2020 Summer Olympics
South African male field hockey players
Olympic field hockey players of South Africa
People from Bitou Local Municipality
Male field hockey midfielders
TuksHockey Club players
Field hockey players at the 2022 Commonwealth Games
University of Pretoria alumni
21st-century South African people
2023 Men's FIH Hockey World Cup players